This is a list of notable BITS Pilani alumni.

Entrepreneurs

Corporate Leaders

Academia

Social Activists, Politics and Government

Film

Art, Music, Writers & Dance

References

 BITSAA (Birla Institute of Technology & Science Alumni Association

Birla Institute of Technology and Science, Pilani alumni
BITS Pilani